Wendeng is a district of Weihai, Shandong province, China. Wendeng is primarily an industrial based area, with a large minority of citizens working as farmers.

Administrative divisions
As 2017, this district is divided to 3 subdistricts, 12 towns and 1 other.
Subdistricts
Longshanlu Subdistrict
Tianfulu Subdistrict
Huanshanlu Subdistrict

Towns

Others
Wendeng Development Zone

Climate

Transport 
 China National Highway 309
 Yanji Expressway
 Qingwei Expressway
 Shandong Provincial Highway 204
 Shandong Provincial Highway 804
 Shandong Provincial Highway 901

Friendship Cities
  Cheonan-si, South Chungcheong, South Korea

References

External links
 Wendeng Government website

Cities in Shandong
Weihai